Pseudodeltaspis carolinae is a species of beetle in the family Cerambycidae. It was described by Audureau in 2008.

References

Trachyderini
Beetles described in 2008